Brădetu may refer to several villages in Romania:

 Brădetu, a village in Brăduleț Commune, Argeș County
 Brădetu, a village in Nistorești Commune, Vrancea County

See also 
 Brădet (disambiguation)
 Brădești (disambiguation)
 Brădățel (disambiguation)
 Brădeanca (disambiguation)
 Brădetul River (disambiguation)